Wade Dominguez (May 10, 1966 – August 26, 1998) was an American actor, model, singer, and dancer best known for his portrayal as Emilio Ramírez in Dangerous Minds.

Early life
Dominguez was born on May 10, 1966 in Santa Clara County, California to parents Robert Dominguez and Sharyn Dale Harpe Dominguez on May 10, 1966. He attended and later graduated from Live Oak High School, Morgan Hill in 1985. Following his education, he moved to Los Angeles, California to pursue an acting career.

Career 
Dominguez moved to Los Angeles to pursue an acting career and enrolled in classes taught by Oscar nominee Jeannie Berlin. Berlin's mother, Elaine May, was so impressed with Dominguez's work in class that she began recommending him for roles. While he was on modeling duties in Italy, Domínguez landed a small acting role in an American soap opera. His first real role in a movie came in 1994, when he appeared in an erotic film called Erotique directed by Lizzie Borden, that focused on female phone sex workers. In 1995, Dominguez landed a role in the box office hit Dangerous Minds as a troubled teenager in school who is caught up with drugs, violence, and gang troubles in the ghetto. 

Following the success of Dangerous Minds, he played the role of a thief in City of Industry. He also had a lead role as a rookie policeman in The Taxman and a supporting role in Shadow of Doubt, in which he played opposite Melanie Griffith and Tom Berenger as a hip-hop artist who is accused of murder. He also appeared in the music video of "Losing my Religion" by R.E.M.

Death 
Dominguez died of AIDS at the age of 32. Actress Elizabeth Berkley visited Dominguez in his hospital bed and showed him a rough cut of his last film, Taxman. He then broke down crying, saying "I'm so good, I'm so good." Dominguez died before the release of the film, which is dedicated to him.

Filmography

References

External links
 
Obituary

1966 births
1998 deaths
Male actors from the San Francisco Bay Area
American male film actors
American male dancers
Male models from California
Deaths from respiratory failure
People from Morgan Hill, California
20th-century American male actors
20th-century American singers
20th-century American dancers
20th-century American male singers
AIDS-related deaths in California